Tanjah is an album by American jazz pianist Randy Weston recorded in May 1973 in New York City and originally released on the Polydor label.

Reception

Allmusic awarded the album 4½ stars, with its review by Scott Yanow stating: "The weak points are Weston's use of the Fender Rhodes on a few songs (it waters down his personality) and Candido's chanting during an otherwise exciting version of 'Hi-Fly,' but those are easily compensated for by the infectious calypso 'Jamaican East' and Liston's inventive reworking of 'Little Niles.' Recommended."

Track listing 
All compositions by Randy Weston
 "Hi-Fly" - 5:06   
 "In Memory Of" - 5:55   
 "Sweet Meat" - 3:42   
 "Jamaica East" - 4:36   
 "Sweet Meat [First Alternative Take]" - 3:54 Bonus track on CD reissue   
 "Tanjah" - 8:36   
 "The Last Day" - 4:07   
 "Sweet Meat [Second Alternative Take]" - 3:46 Bonus track on CD reissue   
 "Little Niles" - 4:11

Personnel 
Randy Weston - piano
Ernie Royal, Ray Copeland, Jon Faddis - trumpet, flugelhorn
Al Grey - trombone
Jack Jeffers - bass trombone
Julius Watkins - French horn
Norris Turney - alto saxophone, piccolo
Taiwo Yusve Divall - alto saxophone, ashiko drums
Budd Johnson - tenor saxophone, soprano saxophone, clarinet 
Billy Harper - tenor saxophone, flute
Danny Bank - baritone saxophone, bass clarinet, flute
Ron Carter - bass
Rudy Collins - drums
Azzedin Weston - percussion
Candido Camero - percussion, narrator
Omar Clay - marimba, timbales
Earl Williams - percussion
Ahmed Abdul-Malik - oud, narrator 
Delores Ivory Davis - vocals on "The Last Day"
Melba Liston - arranger

References 

Randy Weston albums
1974 albums
Polydor Records albums
Albums arranged by Melba Liston